Tan Sri Datuk Seri Panglima David Wong Dak Wah (Pha̍k-fa-sṳ: Vòng Tha̍t-fà; born 20 August 1953) is a Malaysian lawyer and judge who served as the fifth Chief Judge of Sabah and Sarawak.

Education 
Wong attended the University of New South Wales in Sydney, Australia. He graduated with a Bachelor of Commerce (BCom.), majoring in accountancy, in 1976 and a Bachelor of Laws (LL.B.) in 1977.

Career 
On 29 September 2005, Wong was appointed as judicial commissioner at the High Court in Kuching. He was promoted to the post of judge at the same court on 11 April 2007.

On 15 January 2009, he was transferred to the High Court in Kota Kinabalu.

On 8 January 2013, he was appointed as a judge at the Court of Appeal of Malaysia, second highest court in the judicial hierarchy of Malaysia. He held this position until 27 April 2018. He was then appointed a judge at the Federal Court of Malaysia, ascending to the apex court in the country. Less than two months later, Wong was sworn-in by the Yang di-Pertuan Agong (King of Malaysia) to the office of Chief Judge of The High Court of Sabah and Sarawak (CJSS), replacing Richard Malanjum who was elevated to the post of Chief Justice of Malaysia. As such, he now occupies the fourth highest judicial office in the country after the Chief Justice of Malaysia (CJ), President of the Court of Appeal of Malaysia (PCA) and Chief Judge of The High Court of Malaya (CJM).

On 19 February 2020, Wong officially retired as CJSS having reached the mandatory retirement age.

Honours 
  :
  Commander of the Order of Loyalty to the Crown of Malaysia (PSM) - Tan Sri (2019)

  :
  Commander of the Order of Kinabalu (PGDK) - Datuk (2009)
  Grand Commander of the Order of Kinabalu (SPDK) - Datuk Seri Panglima (2018)

References 

Living people
1953 births
20th-century Malaysian lawyers
21st-century Malaysian judges
People from Sabah
University of New South Wales alumni
Malaysian people of Chinese descent
Commanders of the Order of Loyalty to the Crown of Malaysia
Grand Commanders of the Order of Kinabalu
Commanders of the Order of Kinabalu